Riding Mountain is an electoral division in the Canadian province of Manitoba.  It was created by redistribution in 2008.

Communities in the riding include Minnedosa, Rapid City, Rivers, Virden and Birtle. The riding's population in 2006 was 21,245.

List of provincial representatives

Electoral results

2011 general election

2016 general election

2019 general election

References

Manitoba provincial electoral districts